Frank A. Vincent (October 12, 1932 – November 26, 2010) was an American football player and coach. He was selected by the Pittsburgh Steelers in the 1955 NFL Draft. Vincent served as the head football coach at Glenville State College in Glenville, West Virginia from 1980 to 1986. Prior to that, Vincent was a high school football coach at Charleston High School in West Virginia, where he captured three straight Class AAA state championships.

References

Place of birth missing
1932 births
2010 deaths
American football centers
Glenville State Pioneers football coaches
Glenville State Pioneers football players
High school football coaches in West Virginia